Lin Jaldati (born Rebekka Brilleslijper; 13 December 1912 – 31 August 1988) was a Dutch-born, East German-based Yiddish singer. She was a Holocaust survivor, and one of the last people to see Anne Frank. After the war she published an article, "Memories of Anne Frank," in Joachim Hellwig and Günther Deicke's book A Diary for Anne Frank.  A self-professed socialist, she performed in Yiddish in the Soviet Union, China, North Korea and Vietnam from the 1950s to the 1970s.

Life and career
Lin Jaldati was born as Rebekka Brilleslijper on 13 December 1912 in Amsterdam, Netherlands, the eldest of three children of Fijtje (née Gerritse) and Joseph Brilleslijper. Her younger sister was Janny Brandes-Brilleslijper. Her sister called her Lientje. During World War II, she was deported to the Bergen-Belsen concentration camp and the Auschwitz concentration camp, and she survived. She was one of the last people to see Anne Frank.

Jaldati was a Yiddish singer. She performed in Moscow in the late 1950s. By 1965, she performed in China and North Korea. She performed in Indonesia, Thailand, India and Vietnam in the 1970s.

Jaldati was married to Eberhard Rebling, a German pianist and musicologist who emigrated to the Netherlands in 1936. They had two daughters, Kathinka Rebling (born 1941) and Jalda Rebling (born 1951). From 1952, they resided in East Berlin. She was a proponent of socialism.

Death
Lin Jaldati died on 31 August 1988 in East Berlin, Germany.

References

1912 births
1988 deaths
Musicians from Amsterdam
Dutch Jews
Bergen-Belsen concentration camp survivors
Auschwitz concentration camp survivors
Jewish concentration camp survivors
Dutch emigrants to East Germany
People from East Berlin
Yiddish-language singers
20th-century Dutch women singers
20th-century German women singers
Anne Frank
Jewish women singers